Latvia competed at the 2015 Summer Universiade in Gwangju, South Korea.

Medal by sports

Medalists

References
 Country overview: Latvia on the official website

2015 in Latvian sport
Nations at the 2015 Summer Universiade
2015